Listed below are the dates and results for the First Round for the African zone (CAF) of the 1994 FIFA World Cup qualification tournament.  For an overview of the entire African zone, see the article 1994 FIFA World Cup qualification (CAF).  For an overview of the qualification rounds in their entirety, see the article 1994 FIFA World Cup qualification.

A total of 40 CAF teams entered the competition. However, Burkina Faso, Gambia, Malawi, Mali, Mauritania, São Tomé and Príncipe, Sierra Leone and Sudan all withdrew before the draw was made. In addition, Liberia and Libya withdraw during qualification due to UN sanctions.

The African zone was allocated 3 places (out of 24) in the final tournament.

For the First Round of play, the zone's 36 remaining teams were divided into 9 groups of 4 teams each.  The teams would play against each other on a home-and-away basis, with the group winners advancing to the Final Round.

Results

Group A

Algeria advanced to the Final Round.

Group B

Liberia withdrew after 2 matches, results were annulled. Swaziland and Zaire did not play last match as neither could qualify

Cameroon advanced to the Final Round.

Group C

Togo replaced Sierra Leone after the latter withdrew after seeding.

Angola vs Togo was not played, as neither team could advance with a win.

Zimbabwe advanced to the Final Round.

Group D

South Africa replaced São Tomé and Príncipe after the latter withdrew after seeding.

Nigeria advanced to the Final Round.

Group E

Ivory Coast advanced to the Final Round.

Group F

Benin replaced Malawi after the latter withdrew after seeding.

Morocco advanced to the Final Round.

Group G

Senegal advanced to the Final Round.

Group H

Namibia replaced Burkina Faso who withdrew after seeding

Zambia advanced to the Final Round.

Group I

Guinea advanced to the Final Round.

Notes

External links
 Detailed Match Results at RSSSF

1994 FIFA World Cup qualification (CAF)
Qual
Qual